Pima Rose Academy is a public charter high school in Tucson, Arizona.

Mission Statement:  Pima Rose Academy, as an alternative high school providing credit recovery for students with poor academic standing, will “Honor the Promise of Education” By: 
 Training students in the fundamental skills needed to graduate high school, transition into continuing education or college, and explore career choices.
 Expanding how students learn how to think.
 Creating life options / opportunities for each graduate.

References 

Arizona Department of Education Information
http://www.ade.az.gov/edd/NewDetails.asp?EntityID=90997&RefTypeID=1999

Charter schools in Arizona
Educational institutions in the United States with year of establishment missing
Public high schools in Arizona
Schools in Tucson, Arizona
2001 establishments in Arizona
Educational institutions established in 2001